La Platte is a census-designated place (CDP) in Sarpy County, Nebraska, United States.

History
La Platte was laid out in 1870. It was named from the Platte River.

A post office was established at La Platte in 1871, and remained in operation until it was discontinued in 1955.

Geography

Demographics

As of the census of 2010, there were 114 people living in the CDP. The population density was 142.91 inhabitants/ km. Of the 114 inhabitants, La Platte was composed of 91.23% white, 0% were African-American, 4.39% were Native American, 0% were Asian, 0% were Pacific Islanders, 3.51% were from other races and the 0.88% belonged to two or more races. Of the total population 6.14% were Hispanic or Latino of any race.

References

Census-designated places in Sarpy County, Nebraska
Census-designated places in Nebraska